The Christian Union (Independent Forum in 1998—2019) is a Slovak right-wing conservative political party. The chairwoman of the party since 2019 is Anna Záborská. At present, he has five deputies of the National Council of the Slovak Republic, elected on the candidate of the party OĽANO-NOVA-KÚ-ZZ.

Foundation and history

Independent Forum 
The Independent Forum was registered with the Ministry of the Interior on August 27, 1998, and the only chairman of the party during its tenure was Tomáš Černý. The main goal of the party was to help independent candidates run in municipal elections. She was active in Bratislava, where several of her candidates were elected to local councils and the city council. A prominent representative of this party was the former director of the Slovak Trade Inspection and consumer protection activist Marta Černá

The party did not participate in the parliamentary elections.

Christian Union

Transformation of NF to KÚ, elections to EP 2019 and NR SR 2020 
On February 8, 2019, the party was renamed (registered on August 27, 1998), when on January 7, 2019, the statute and seat of this party changed and on February 8, 2019, it was renamed to the current name Christian Union. This transformation of this entity de facto created a new party, but de jure not This step, as the fragmentation of Christian forces and the promotion of Záborská's personal ambitions, was criticized by the chairman of KDH, Alojz Hlina. The founders did so so that they could avoid collecting 10,000 signatures to form a new political party.

In the 2019 European Parliament election, the party won 3.85% of the vote and did not win any seats.

After the elections, the need to unite Christian political forces with KDH or KDŽP was discussed. In the end, the merger did not take place in the autumn of 2019, as President Alojz Hlina offered the Christian Union only 2 seats as a KDH candidate. On the contrary, the KU came closer to the OĽANO movement, on whose candidate list OĽaNO in the parliamentary elections 19 candidates for the KÚ ran, while its chairwoman Anna Záborská ran from 4th place. NOVA and Zmena Zdola did the same with OĽaNO in order to avoid an increased clause for electoral coalitions.

OĽaNO, together with the KÚ, also offered the pre-election procedure to the KDH, to which it offered half the seats on the candidate and, after the elections, its own parliamentary club. KDH rejected this offer.

Election period 2020-2024 
In the parliamentary elections in February 2020, OĽANO-NOVA-KÚ-ZZ party became the winner of the parliamentary elections, which so far only the Smer-SD and HZDS parties have succeeded in Slovakia. Five members of the Christian Union were elected as deputies.

KÚ Politicians

Party leadership 

 Anna Záborská – chairwoman

Other KÚ politicians 

 Richard Vašečka
 Branislav Škripek
 Ján Szőllős
 Katarína Hatráková
 Radovan Marcinčin

Election results

Notes

References

External links 

 Official Page
 Christian Union in the register of parties of the Ministry of Interior of the Slovak Republic

Christian Democratic Movement breakaway groups
Organizations established in 2019
2019 establishments in Slovakia
Catholic political parties